Redeemer is the third album by D'espairsRay released on March 11, 2009 in Japan. The album was released in Europe on May 24, 2009.

The album has also been released in the United States at Hot Topic and other record stores.

The album debuted at #39 on the Oricon Charts with 4,032 copies sold.

Track listing

Personnel
Hizumi – vocals
Karyu – guitar
Zero - bass guitar
Tsukasa – drums

References

2007 albums
D'espairsRay albums